A pendulum is a body suspended from a fixed support so that it swings freely back and forth under the influence of gravity. When a pendulum is displaced sideways from its resting, equilibrium position, it is subject to a restoring force due to gravity that will accelerate it back toward the equilibrium position. When released, the restoring force acting on the pendulum's mass causes it to oscillate about the equilibrium position, swinging it back and forth. The mathematics of pendulums are in general quite complicated. Simplifying assumptions can be made, which in the case of a simple pendulum allow the equations of motion to be solved analytically for small-angle oscillations.

Simple gravity pendulum 

A simple gravity pendulum is an idealized mathematical model of a real pendulum. This is a weight (or bob) on the end of a massless cord suspended from a pivot, without friction.  Since in this model there is no frictional energy loss, when given an initial displacement it will swing back and forth at a constant amplitude.  The model is based on these assumptions:
 The rod or cord on which the bob swings is massless, inextensible and always remains taut.
 The bob is a point mass.
 Motion occurs only in two dimensions, i.e. the bob does not trace an ellipse but an arc.
 The motion does not lose energy to friction or air resistance.
 The gravitational field is uniform.
 The support does not move.

The differential equation which represents the motion of a simple pendulum is

Small-angle approximation

The differential equation given above is not easily solved, and there is no solution that can be written in terms of elementary functions. However, adding a restriction to the size of the oscillation's amplitude gives a form whose solution can be easily obtained. If it is assumed that the angle is much less than 1 radian (often cited as less than 0.1 radians, about 6°), or

then substituting for  into  using the small-angle approximation,

yields the equation for a harmonic oscillator,

The error due to the approximation is of order  (from the Taylor expansion for ).

Let the starting angle be . If it is assumed that the pendulum is released with zero angular velocity, the solution becomes

The motion is simple harmonic motion where  is the amplitude of the oscillation (that is, the maximum angle between the rod of the pendulum and the vertical). The corresponding approximate period of the motion is then

which is known as Christiaan Huygens's law for the period. Note that under the small-angle approximation, the period is independent of the amplitude ; this is the property of isochronism that Galileo discovered.

Rule of thumb for pendulum length

 gives 

If SI units are used (i.e. measure in metres and seconds), and assuming the measurement is taking place on the Earth's surface, then , and  (0.994 is the approximation to 3 decimal places).

Therefore, relatively reasonable approximations for the length and period are:

Arbitrary-amplitude period 

For amplitudes beyond the small angle approximation, one can compute the exact period by first inverting the equation for the angular velocity obtained from the energy method,

and then integrating over one complete cycle,

or twice the half-cycle

or four times the quarter-cycle

which leads to

Note that this integral diverges as  approaches the vertical

so that a pendulum with just the right energy to go vertical will never actually get there. (Conversely, a pendulum close to its maximum can take an arbitrarily long time to fall down.)

This integral can be rewritten in terms of elliptic integrals as

where  is the incomplete elliptic integral of the first kind defined by

Or more concisely by the substitution

Here  is the complete elliptic integral of the first kind defined by

For comparison of the approximation to the full solution, consider the period of a pendulum of length 1 m on Earth ( = ) at initial angle 10 degrees is

The linear approximation gives

From here there are many ways to proceed to calculate the elliptic integral.

Legendre polynomial solution for the elliptic integral
Given  and the Legendre polynomial solution for the elliptic integral:

where  denotes the double factorial, an exact solution to the period of a simple pendulum is:

Power series solution for the elliptic integral 
Another formulation of the above solution can be found if the following Maclaurin series:

is used in the Legendre polynomial solution above.
The resulting power series is:

more fractions available in the On-Line Encyclopedia of Integer Sequences with  having the numerators and  having the denominators.

Arithmetic-geometric mean solution for elliptic integral
Given  and the arithmetic–geometric mean solution of the elliptic integral:

This yields an alternative and faster-converging formula for the period:

The first iteration of this algorithm gives

This approximation has the relative error of less than 1% for angles up to 96.11 degrees. Since  the expression can be written more concisely as

The second order expansion of  reduces to 

A second iteration of this algorithm gives

This second approximation has a relative error of less than 1% for angles up to 163.10 degrees.

Approximate formulae for the nonlinear pendulum period 
Though the exact period  can be determined, for any finite amplitude  rad, by evaluating the corresponding complete elliptic integral , where , this is often avoided in applications because it is not possible to express this integral in a closed form in terms of elementary functions. This has made way for research on simple approximate formulae for the increase of the pendulum period with amplitude (useful in introductory physics labs, classical mechanics, electromagnetism, acoustics, electronics, superconductivity, etc. The approximate formulae found by different authors can be classified as follows:

 ‘Not so large-angle’ formulae, i.e. those yielding good estimates for amplitudes below  rad (a natural limit for a bob on the end of a flexible string), though the deviation with respect to the exact period increases monotonically with amplitude, being unsuitable for amplitudes near to  rad. One of the simplest formulae found in literature is the following one by Lima (2006): , where .
 ‘Very large-angle’ formulae, i.e. those which approximate the exact period asymptotically for amplitudes near to rad, with an error that increases monotonically for smaller amplitudes (i.e., unsuitable for small amplitudes). One of the better such formulae is that by Cromer, namely: .

As accurate timers and sensors are currently available even in introductory physics labs, the experimental errors found in ‘very large-angle’ experiments are already small enough for a comparison with the exact period and a very good agreement between theory and experiments in which friction is negligible has been found. Since this activity has been encouraged by many instructors, a simple approximate formula for the pendulum period valid for all possible amplitudes, to which experimental data could be compared, was sought. In 2008, Lima derived a weighted-average formula with this characteristic:

where , which presents a maximum error of only 0.6% (at ).

Arbitrary-amplitude angular displacement Fourier series

where  is the elliptic nome, and  the angular frequency.

If one defines

 can be approximated using the expansion

(see ). Note that for  we have , thus the approximation is applicable even for large amplitudes.

Examples 

The animations below depict the motion of a simple (frictionless) pendulum with increasing amounts of initial displacement of the bob, or equivalently increasing initial velocity. The small graph above each pendulum is the corresponding phase plane diagram; the horizontal axis is displacement and the vertical axis is velocity.  With a large enough initial velocity the pendulum does not oscillate back and forth but rotates completely around the pivot.

Compound pendulum 

A compound pendulum (or physical pendulum) is one where the rod is not massless, and may have extended size; that is, an arbitrarily shaped rigid body swinging by a pivot. In this case the pendulum's period depends on its moment of inertia  around the pivot point.

The equation of torque gives:

where:
 is the angular acceleration.
 is the torque

The torque is generated by gravity so:

where:
 is the mass of the body
 is the distance from the pivot to the object's center of mass
 is the angle from the vertical

Hence, under the small-angle approximation ,

where  is the moment of inertia of the body about the pivot point.

And a frequency of

If the initial angle is taken into consideration (for large amplitudes), then the expression for  becomes: 

and gives a period of: 

Physical interpretation of the imaginary period 

The Jacobian elliptic function that expresses the position of a pendulum as a function of time is a doubly periodic function with a real period and an imaginary period. The real period is, of course, the time it takes the pendulum to go through one full cycle.

Coupled pendula 

Coupled pendulums can affect each other's motion, either through a direction connection (such as a spring connecting the bobs) or through motions in a supporting structure (such as a tabletop). The equations of motion for two identical simple pendulums coupled by a spring connecting the bobs can be obtained using Lagrangian Mechanics.

The kinetic energy of the system is:

The potential energy of the system is:

The displacement  of the spring from its equilibrium position assumes the small angle approximation.

The Lagrangian is then

which leads to the following set of coupled differential equations:

Adding and subtracting these two equations in turn, and applying the small angle approximation, gives two harmonic oscillator equations in the variables  and :

with the corresponding solutions

where

If the bobs are not given an initial push, then the condition  requires , which gives (after some rearranging):

See also

Blackburn pendulum
Conical pendulum
Cycloidal pendulum
Double pendulum
Inverted pendulum
Kapitza's pendulum
Rayleigh–Lorentz pendulum
Spring pendulum
Mathieu function
Pendulum equations (software)

References

Further reading

External links
Mathworld article on Mathieu Function

Differential equations
Dynamical systems
Horology
Mathematical physics
Mathematics